Wilhelm Mohr may refer to:

Wilhelm Mohr (aviator) (1917–2016), Norwegian aviation officer
Wilhelm Mohr (politician) (1886–1978), Norwegian landowner and politician
Wilhelm Mohr (journalist) (1838–1888), German journalist